Nicolae Juravschi (given name also transliterated Nikolai, Nikolaï, or Nikolay and surname Juravski, Juravskiy, Yuravskiy, or Zhuravsky; born 8 August 1964 in Chircăiești, Căușeni) is a Moldovan politician and former canoe sprinter, who won three Olympic medals in the C-2 event with his teammate Viktor Reneysky. In the Soviet era Juravschi trained at the Armed Forces sports society in Kishinev (now Chișinău), Moldova.

The pair won two gold medals at the 1988 Summer Olympics, as competitors for the USSR. In the next three years Juravschi won a total of eight world championship gold medals in the C-2 and C-4 events.

Despite this success Reneysky and Juravschi were not selected for the Unified Team at the 1992 Olympics, having been defeated in the trials. Juravschi was invited to represent Romania instead and reached two finals.

He then returned to Moldova and in 1995 persuaded his former partner Reneysky, from Belarus, to join forces once more and represent Moldova at the 1996 Olympics. They won a silver medal at the Atlanta games.

Juravski is now president of the Moldovan Olympic Committee and the Moldovan Canoe-Kayak Federation.

He has been a member of the Parliament of Moldova since 2011. Originally a member of the Liberal Democratic Party, he is now a member of the European People's Party of Moldova.

References

External links 
 
 

1964 births
Living people
Moldovan male canoeists
Romanian male canoeists
Soviet male canoeists
Olympic canoeists of Moldova
Olympic canoeists of Romania
Olympic canoeists of the Soviet Union
Olympic gold medalists for the Soviet Union
Olympic silver medalists for Moldova
Olympic medalists in canoeing
Canoeists at the 1988 Summer Olympics
Canoeists at the 1992 Summer Olympics
Canoeists at the 1996 Summer Olympics
Medalists at the 1988 Summer Olympics
Medalists at the 1996 Summer Olympics
ICF Canoe Sprint World Championships medalists in Canadian
People from Căușeni District
Armed Forces sports society athletes
Honoured Masters of Sport of the USSR
Recipients of the Order of Friendship of Peoples
Recipients of the Order of the Republic (Moldova)
Moldovan MPs 2010–2014
Moldovan sportsperson-politicians